The 2003 Arun District Council election took place on 1 May 2003 to elect members of Arun District Council in West Sussex, England. The whole council was up for election with boundary changes since the last election in 1999. The Conservative Party stayed in overall control of the council.

Campaign
Before the election the Conservatives ran the council, as they had since it was founded in 1973, with 37 seats, compared to 9 Liberal Democrats, 8 Labour and 2 Independent councillors. In total 138 candidates stood for the 56 seats being contested over 27 wards, with the boundaries having been changed since the 1999 election.

Issues in the election included council tax levels, refuse collection, the closure of Arundel Pool, a shortage of low cost homes, crime and anti-social behaviour and plans to devolve power more locally within the council area.

Election result
The results saw the Conservatives stay in control of the council after winning 36 seats, compared to 11 Liberal Democrats, 8 Labour and 1 independent. The leaders of each of the Liberal Democrats, John Richards, Labour, Roger Nash, and independents Bill Redman, were all defeated at the election, with the Labour leader Roger Nash losing by 1 vote in Pevensey ward.

|}

Ward results

References

2003 English local elections
2003
2000s in West Sussex